Nasri Cheppy (16 October 1950 –  18 December 2010) was an Indonesian film director. He directed the six film Catatan si boy action drama series in the late 1980s and early 1990s. In 2003 he directed the hit Eiffel I'm in Love. He is also credited as a screenwriter having written for films such as Demi cinta belahlah dadaku in 1991.

Filmography

As director
Ranjau-ranjau cinta (1984)
Catatan si boy (1987)
Bilur-bilur penyesalan (1987)
Catatan si boy 2 (1988)
Catatan si boy 4 (1990)
Catatan si boy 3 (1990)
Demi cinta belahlah dadaku (1991)
Catatan si Emon (1991)
Catatan si boy 5 (1991)
Eiffel I'm in Love (2003)

As screenwriter
Bilur-bilur penyesalan (1987)
Demi cinta belahlah dadaku (1991)

External links and sources

1950 births
2010 deaths
Indonesian film directors
Indonesian screenwriters